His Best Friend (German: Sein bester Freund) is a 1929 German silent action film directed by and starring Harry Piel and also featuring Dary Holm and Grit Haid. It was shot at the Staaken Studios in Berlin. 
The film's sets were designed by the art director Robert Neppach.

Cast
In alphabetical order
 Ernst Behmer as Hochzeitsgast  
 Charly Berger as Nachtwächter  
 Maria Forescu as Hochzeitsgast  
 Grit Haid as Nora Sanden  
 Dary Holm as Else Kruse  
 Philipp Manning as Meyer  
 Harry Piel as Harry Peters  
 Alexander Sascha as Graf Soderstrom  
 Vera Schmiterlöw as Helga Schott  
 Grit Sloma as Emil Grigoleit  
 Otto Wallburg 
 Aruth Wartan as Boris Radowski

References

Bibliography
 Matias Bleckman. Harry Piel: ein Kino-Mythos und seine Zeit. Filminstitut der Landeshaupstadt Düsseldorf, 1992.

External links

1929 films
Films of the Weimar Republic
Films directed by Harry Piel
German silent feature films
Films about dogs
German black-and-white films
Films shot at Staaken Studios
1920s action films
German action films
Silent action films
1920s German-language films